Caulophryne bacescui is a species of fanfin, a type of anglerfish. The fish is found in the bathyal zone and is known to live in the Peru Trench in the eastern Pacific Ocean.

References

Caulophrynidae
Deep sea fish
Fish described in 1982